Vostox brunneipennis is a species of little earwig in the family Spongiphoridae. It is found throughout the Americas.

References

Further reading

External links

 

Earwigs
Articles created by Qbugbot
Insects described in 1839